Allan dos Santos Natividade (born February 20, 1989) is a Brazilian football player for Esperanza.

Club statistics
Updated to end of 2018 season.

References

External links

Profile at Kamatamare Sanuki

1989 births
Living people
Brazilian footballers
Brazilian expatriate footballers
Association football forwards
J2 League players
Japan Football League players
MIO Biwako Shiga players
Kamatamare Sanuki players
Zweigen Kanazawa players
Brazilian expatriate sportspeople in Japan
Expatriate footballers in Japan
Sportspeople from Rio de Janeiro (state)